A coreless planet is a theoretical type of terrestrial planet that has no metallic core and is thus effectively a giant rocky mantle. It can be formed in cooler regions and far from the star.

Origin
According to a 2008 paper by Sara Seager and Linda Elkins-Tanton, there are probably two ways in which a coreless planet may form.

In the first, the planet accretes from chondrite-like fully oxidized water-rich material, where all the metallic iron is bound into silicate mineral crystals. Such planets may form in cooler regions farther from the central star.

In the second, the planet accretes from both water-rich and iron metal-rich material. However, the metal iron reacts with water to form iron oxide and release hydrogen before differentiation of a metal core has taken place. Provided the iron droplets are well mixed and small enough (<1 centimeter), the predicted end result is that the iron is oxidized and trapped in the mantle, unable to form a core.

Magnetic field
Earth's magnetic field results from its flowing liquid metallic core, according to the dynamo theory, but in super-Earths the mass can produce high pressures with large viscosities and high melting temperatures which could prevent the interiors from separating into different layers and so result in undifferentiated coreless mantles. Magnesium oxide, which is rocky on Earth, can be liquid at the pressures and temperatures found in super-Earths and could generate a magnetic field in the mantles of super-Earths.

Characteristics
The predicted sizes of coreless and cored planets are similar within a few percent, which makes it difficult to interpret the interior composition of exoplanets based on measured planetary masses and radii.

See also
Chthonian planet

References

The Role of Carbon in Extrasolar Planetary Geodynamics and Habitability, Cayman T. Unterborn, Jason E. Kabbes, Jeffrey S. Pigott, Daniel R. Reaman, Wendy R. Panero, (Submitted on 31 October 2013 (v1), last revised 9 November 2013 (this version, v3))

Hypothetical planet types